The Midland Hotel is a 90-bedroom three-star Victorian hotel in Bradford city centre, owned and managed by London-based Peel Hotels.

The architect was Charles Trubshaw, who was contracted to design many railway stations for Midland Railway Company.

Construction of the hotel began in 1885 and took five years to complete.
It was built by the Midland Railway Company as part of the original Forster Square Railway Station, as a showpiece for the company's northern operations.

Following the "golden age of steam" the hotel fell into disrepair until it was bought by Bradford entrepreneur John Pennington in 1992, who restored it and the hotel re-opened as the Pennington Midland Hotel in 1993.
It was sold to Peel Hotels in December 1998, who returned it back to its original name.

During its life, the hotel has played host to many famous guests, including Sir Henry Irving, an English stage actor, who died there in 1905.

The corner block of the hotel on Lower Kirkgate (pictured) was made a grade II listed building in 1983.

See also
Listed buildings in Bradford (City Ward)

References

External links 

 British Listed Buildings.

Railway hotels in England
Hotels in West Yorkshire
Buildings and structures in Bradford
Charles Trubshaw buildings